Vagnhallen Majorna is a Gothenburg tram network stop. It has two platforms with trees that separate the tram tracks from the road. It is one of the only two stations to have this structure; the other one is Ostindiegatan.
Vagnhallen Majorna is an important tram stop because it is near the Vagnhallen Majorna where the tram stop depot is. There are many trams that use the tram stop.

References

Tram stops in Sweden